Club Limoneros de Fútbol is a Mexican football club that plays in the Tercera División de México. The club is based in Martínez de la Torre, Veracruz. Top Scorer Club : Ronaldo Aldair Trinidad Herrera 88 Goals Season 2013-2014 - 2014- 2015

See also
Football in Mexico
Veracruz
Tercera División de México

External links
Official Page

References 

Football clubs in Veracruz
2008 establishments in Mexico